Ramoaaina (Ramuaina) is an Oceanic language spoken on the Duke of York Islands off eastern New Ireland.

Phonology
Phoneme inventory of the Ramoaaina language:

/s/ is used, but mainly in loanwords.

References

External links 
 Materials on Ramoaaina are included in the open access Arthur Capell collections (AC1 and AC2) and Malcolm Ross collection (MR1) held by Paradisec
 Digitised microfilm images from Pacific Manuscripts Bureau (PAMBU) including Ramoaaina

Languages of East New Britain Province
St George linkage